The East Liverpool Potters were an American basketball team based in East Liverpool, Ohio that was a member of the Central Basketball League.

In their first season, the team won the regular season and came in second for the postseason series. A championship game was scheduled with Pittsburgh South Side, the winner of the postseason series, but East Liverpool refused to play because the two teams could not agree on the officials. After getting only 4 wins in 61 games, the team dropped out of the league and was replaced by Alliance for the final 10 games of the 1908–09 season.

Year-by-year

Roster 

Basketball teams in Ohio